Sithu Myint Myint Khin (nicknamed Baby; born Khin Kyi born 13 August 1934) is a five-time Myanmar Academy Award and Myanmar Academy Award (Lifetime Achievement Award - Everlasting Outstanding Honorary Award) winning Burmese film actress who is considered one of the most talented actors of Burmese cinema. She is also the mother of well-known singer and actress May Sweet.

Biography

Myint Myint Khin was born Khin Kyi to Daw Saw Kyi and U Po Min, in Thanlyin in 1934, during the waning days of the British colonial era in Myanmar. Her father, also known as E.A. Fairmen, was an Englishman from India. Myint Myint Khin's English name is Rita Fairmen. She attended a Yangon convent school up to seventh standard. She made her film debut in 1949 with Maya Shin. Not only was she one of the main leading actresses in the 1950s, Myint Myint Khin went on to win multiple (five) Burmese Academy Awards in her nearly five-decade-long career—a feat still unmatched among Burmese actresses.

In her heyday in the 1950s, Myint Myint Khin also dabbled into a singing career and achieved moderate success. Her most famous hit, Naban Hsan, does remain a Burmese standard, having been covered numerous times by later singers, most famously by her singer daughter May Sweet.

Personal life

Myint Myint Khin has retired from the film industry and lives in Yangon. She has five daughters. Her husband Khin Maung Nyunt died in February 2010.
 Tin Aye Myint (Thiri Kaykhaing)
 Khin Aye Myint
 Aye Aye Myint
 Swe Aye Myint (May Sweet)
 Le Yi Myint

Filmography
 Maya Shin (1949)
 Son Bo Aung Din (1955)
 Chit Nyima (1957)
 Ei Lu Baung Twin (1958)
 Kawleikgyin (1959)
 Phyay Shaw Khway (1958)
 Tein Hlwar Moht Moht Lwin (1967)
 Mone Par Tal Maung Ko (1973)
 Chit Thu Yway Mal Chit Wae Lal (1975)
 Mha Ta-Ba A-Cha Ma-Shi-Bi (1980)
 Myitmo Taung Oo Ma Ka Kyu-Tha (1996)

References

1934 births
Burmese film actresses
Burmese people of English descent
Living people
Recipients of the Order of the Union of Myanmar
20th-century Burmese actresses
Anglo-Burmese people
People from Yangon Region